Bob Hensgens is an American politician serving as a member of the Louisiana State Senate from the 26th district. Elected in 2018, he was previously a member of the Louisiana House of Representatives from 2011 to 2018.

Education 
Hensgens attended Vermilion Catholic High School and earned a Bachelor of Science degree in business administration from the University of Louisiana at Lafayette.

Career 
Since 2009, Hensgens has worked as an administrator at the Gueydan Memorial Guest Home in Gueydan, Louisiana. He also served as the major of Gueydan from 2007 to 2011. Hensgens represented the 47th district in the Louisiana House of Representatives from April 2011 to December 2018. He was then elected to the Louisiana State Senate in a December 2018 special election. From 2012 to 2015, Hensgens served as vice chair of the House Agriculture, Forestry, Aquaculture and Rural Development Committee. During the 2019–2020 legislative session, he served as vice chair of the House Judiciary C Committee. Since 2021, he has served as chair of the House Natural Resources Committee.

References 

Living people
Republican Party Louisiana state senators
Republican Party members of the Louisiana House of Representatives
University of Louisiana at Lafayette alumni
People from Gueydan, Louisiana
Year of birth missing (living people)